Colin Dowdeswell (born 12 May 1955) is a former professional tennis player who represented, at different times, Rhodesia, Switzerland and the United Kingdom, and who achieved rank as UK No. 1. During his time on the world tour, he won one singles title and eleven doubles titles. The highlight of his career was reaching the men's doubles final of Wimbledon.

Early life
Dowdeswell was born in London but grew up in Rhodesia and went to university in South Africa.

Tennis career highlights
Partnering Australian Allan Stone, Dowdeswell finished runner-up in doubles at Wimbledon in 1975. Unseeded, after two straight sets wins, they defeated the No. 7 seeds Tom Okker and Marty Riessen in the round of 16 in four sets. They did likewise in eliminating the No. 3 seeds, Bob Hewitt and Frew McMillan, in the quarterfinals. It took Dowdeswell and Stone then five sets to overcome the unseeded team of Dick Crealy and Niki Pilic in the semifinals. They lost the final to another unseeded tandem, Vitas Gerulaitis and Sandy Mayer, 5–7, 6–8, 4–6.

Dowdeswell achieved a career-high singles ranking of world No. 31 in 1983 and a career-high doubles ranking of world No. 24 in 1980.

Career finals

Grand Prix and WCT finals (4)

Singles: 4 (1 title)

Grand Slam, Grand Prix, and WCT finals

Doubles: 28 (11 titles)

Davis Cup
Dowdeswell participated in one Davis Cup tie for Rhodesia in 1976, posting a 2–0 record in singles and an 0–1 record in doubles. He participated in six Davis Cup ties for Great Britain from 1984 to 1986, posting an 0–2 record in singles and a 5–1 record in doubles.

Life outside tennis
Dowdeswell completed his tennis career in 1986 and began a successful career in financial services and private banking with Merrill Lynch. Married with three children, he currently resides in Monaco. He has also resided in Wimbledon.

References

External links
 
 
 
 Official website

British emigrants to Rhodesia
English expatriates in Monaco
English male tennis players
People from Wimbledon, London
Rhodesian male tennis players
Tennis people from Greater London
Swiss male tennis players
Swiss people of English descent
Zimbabwean male tennis players
Zimbabwean people of English descent
British male tennis players
1955 births
Living people